Mġarr ix-Xini Tower is the largest of the coastal watchtowers that the Knights of Malta erected on the island of Gozo. It watches over the entrance to the bay of Mġarr ix-Xini, limits of Għajnsielem, which lies on Gozo's south-west coast.

It was completed in 1661, and its design is similar to the De Redin towers that were commissioned by Grand Master Martin de Redin. Recently, Wirt Għawdex, a heritage NGO, restored the tower. It is now open to the public.

It is one of four surviving coastal watchtowers on Gozo, with the others being Xlendi Tower, Dwejra Tower, and Isopu Tower.

History
Mġarr ix-Xini Tower was completed by June 1661, to a plan by Mederico Blondel. It cost an estimated 857 scudi, which were financed by the Università of Gozo. The design is similar to the De Redin towers on mainland Malta, having a square plan with two floors. However, the design differed since its entrance was approached by a flight of steps and a drawbridge, unlike the other towers which had a retractable ladder.

The tower has Santa Cecilia Tower (built 1613) and Saint Mary's Tower (built 1618) in its line of sight. It was originally manned by a castellan and a bombardier, but was no longer permanently manned by 1785 since the Ottoman threat had receded. It was rearmed with two 6-pounder iron guns in 1792.

Present day

The tower was restored in 2000 by the Ministry for Gozo and Wirt Għawdex. A path leading to the tower from the bay was also reopened, enabling visitors to enjoy the walk to the tower. Other restoration works were carried out in 2008, and restoration was finally completed in 2009.

The tower is now open to the public on Saturdays.

Further reading
 Malta and Gozo

References

External links

National Inventory of the Cultural Property of the Maltese Islands

Towers completed in 1661
Xewkija
Għajnsielem
National Inventory of the Cultural Property of the Maltese Islands
1661 establishments in Malta